The 2008–09 Championnat de France Amateurs season was the 11th edition of the competition since its establishment. The competition officially began 9 August 2008 and ended on 30 May 2009. The competition consists of 72 clubs spread into four parallel groups of 18.

It is open to reserve teams in France and amateur clubs in France, although only the amateur clubs are eligible for promotion to the Championnat National. The highest-placed amateur team in each pool are promoted, replaced by the four lowest-placed in the Championnat.

Promotion and relegation from 2007–08
Relegated from Championnat National to CFA
 SO Romorantin to Groupe C
 FC Martigues to Groupe B
 Pau FC to Groupe C
 Villemomble Sports to Groupe D

Promoted from CFA to Championnat National
 Pacy Vallée-d'Eure
 Croix de Savoie Gaillard
 SO Cassis Carnoux
 Aviron Bayonnais FC

Standings
Note: Unlike the higher leagues, a win in the CFA is worth 4 points, with 2 points for a draw and 1 for a defeat.

Groupe A

Groupe B

Groupe C

Groupe D

Playoffs
The Championnat de France Amateurs playoffs are designated for only the professional clubs B teams playing in the league. The best finishing professional reserve club in each group will advance to the playoffs where they will face each other at a site to be determined. The semi-final opponents are determined by the best finishing place. The best finishing reserve club will be awarded the 1st seed, while the worst finishing reserve club of the four will be awarded the 4th seed.

Semi-finals

Final

Top goalscorers
Last updated 3 May 2009

Groupe A

Groupe B

Groupe C

Groupe D

External links
 CFA Official Page
 CFA Statistics

Championnat National 2 seasons
4
France